The Mary with Child and Saints Stephen, Jerome and Mauritius (German: Maria mit Kind und den Hll. Stephanus, Hieronymus und Mauritius), also called the Virgin with Three Saints, is a religious painting by Titian which hangs in the Kunsthistorisches Museum in Vienna.

Attribution 
According to Georg Gronau, the picture in the Vienna Gallery is a replica and of inferior quality. Charles Ricketts, however, lists both the "flamboyant" Madonna and Three Saints in the Louvre, and this "more elaborate and earlier" version of the same picture at Vienna as authentic Titians.

Copies

See also 

 Sacra conversazione

References

Sources 

 Gronau, Georg (1904). Titian. London: Duckworth and Co; New York: Charles Scribner's Sons. pp. 282–283.
 Ricketts, Charles (1910). Titian. London: Methuen & Co. Ltd. pp. 50–51, 175, 178, plate xxxi.
 "Maria mit Kind und den Hll. Stephanus, Hieronymus und Mauritius". Kunsthistorisches Museum Wien. Retrieved 21 November 2022.

Paintings of the Madonna and Child by Titian